Dog Eat Dog is a 2001 British sex comedy film, directed by Moody Shoaibi and written by Moody Shoaibi and Mark Tonderai.

Plot
Four friends, Rooster, CJ, Jess and Chang, dream of making it as DJs but first they need cash — lots of it, and fast. Their lack of funds is compounded by problems ranging from small (cheating girlfriends, mothers in sleazy movies) to large (the towering presence of Tunde, the local porn king). They come up with various schemes, each more harebrained than the last—stealing library books, breaking and entering, dognapping—all with a spectacular lack of success. And into the bargain, they've fallen foul of drugs baron, Jesus (Gary Kemp), whose slogan is "You've gotta have faith in Jesus".

Cast
Mark Tonderai as Rooster
Nathan Constance as Jess
David Oyelowo as CJ 
Melanie Blatt as Jany, the ex-girlfriend
Crunski as Chang 	
Alan Davies as Phil 
Gary Kemp as Jesus
Steve Toussaint as Darcy 
Ricky Gervais as Bouncer
Rebecca Hazlewood as Mina
Stewart Wright as Eastwood
Dilys Laye as Edith Scarman
Daniel Kitson as Bus Driver

Reception
The film received mixed reviews. According to Time Out, "[Shoaibi and Tonderai's] debut feature basically resembles an extended sitcom" and "The film's gross-out humour actually smacks of the Farrelly Brothers' sloppy seconds, right down to the compulsory semen gag." Jamie Russell, writing for the BBC, gave the film two out of five stars, concluding that "Its heart is in the right place, but there's no escaping the fact that this is lightweight stuff."

References

External links

2001 films
British crime comedy films
German crime comedy films
English-language German films
Films shot at Pinewood Studios
2000s crime comedy films
Black British cinema
Black British mass media
Black British films
2001 comedy films
2000s English-language films
2000s British films
2000s German films